Mukul Manda Sangma(born 20 April 1965) is an Indian politician and physician who was the 11th Chief Minister of Meghalaya from 2010 to 2018 and is currently leader of the opposition in the Meghalaya Legislative Assembly since 2018.Sangma also served as Deputy Chief Minister of Meghalaya from 2009 to 2010,2007 to 2008 and 2005 to 2005. He has been a member of the All India Trinamool Congress since November 2021; previously, he was a longtime member of the Indian National Congress.

Early life and career 
Sangma was born on 20 April 1965, son of teachers Binoy Bhushan M. Marak and Roshanara Begum at Ampatigiri, now the headquarters of South West Garo Hills district. In 1990, he graduated in medicine from the Regional Institute of Medical Sciences in Imphal in 1990, and joined Zikzak Public Health Centre as a health and medical officer in 1991.

Political career
In 1993, Sangma was elected to the Meghalaya Legislative Assembly from Ampatigiri as an independent candidate, following which he was appointed the Chairman of the Meghalaya Transport Corporation. Sangma was re-elected to the Meghalaya Legislative Assembly in 1998, 2003, 2008, 2013 , 2018 as a representative of the Indian National Congress.

He held office as the Parliamentary Secretary for the Government of Meghalaya between the years 1996 and 1998.

In 2003, he became the home and education minister in the D. D. Lapang government of Meghalaya. He was also appointed the Deputy Chief Minister of Meghalaya in 2005.

In May 2009, he became the Deputy Chief Minister of Meghalaya, acting as a representative of the Indian National Congress-led Meghalaya United Alliance (MUA) government.

In April 2010, Sangma took oath as the 11th Chief Minister of Meghalaya, following the resignation of DD Lapang. He was sworn in for a second straight term in March 2013.

Sangma was named as one of the candidates for the 2018 Assembly elections in Meghalaya, contesting  seats from the Songsak and Ampati constituencies in which he won from both. Currently, he serves as the Leader of Opposition in Meghalaya Legislative Assembly. His successor as Chief Minister in 2018 was Conrad Sangma, who is not related to him.

Mukul Sangma and 11 other Congress MLAs joined the All India Trinamool Congress (TMC) in November 2021, making the TMC the main opposition party in the state.

Key Schemes & Initiatives
In 2015, Sangma launched the Meghalaya Health Insurance Scheme, a scheme to provide health coverage to families that exist below the poverty line. He launched Phase 2 in 2015, which aimed at providing a comprehensive health cover to the citizens of the state.

Sangma has launched multiple social assistance programmes, including the Special Wedding Assistance Scheme for orphaned girls over the age of 18 and a programme for providing aid to single mothers and orphaned girls.

In 2017, Sangma launched the Life Programme (Livelihood Intervention and Facilitation of Entrepreneurship), aimed towards empowering people for economic prosperity. He also laid the foundations for the Shillong Government College of Engineering, the first engineering college in the state of Meghalaya, followed by two more colleges at Malwai and Tura.

He launched "Mission Football", an initiative to promote sports in Meghalaya and develop the sports at a grassroots level.

In 2018, he launched a Career Guidance Program to offer specialized coaching support for underprivileged students.

Positions held 

 Elected to Meghalaya Legislative Assembly in 1993, 1998, 2003, 2008, 2013 and 2018
 Parliamentary Secretary of the Government of Meghalaya between 1996 and 1998.
 Home and Education Minister of Meghalaya in 2003.
 Deputy Chief Minister of Meghalaya in 2005 and 2009.
 Chief Minister of Meghalaya from 2010 to 2018

Personal life 
Sangma is married to Dikkanchi D. Shira, who is an M.L.A., and has 4 children. His eldest daughter, Miani D. Shira, and his brother, Zenith Sangma, are also politicians.

Notes

|-

References

External links 

 Official website

Indian National Congress politicians from Meghalaya
People from South West Garo Hills district
1965 births
Living people
20th-century Indian medical doctors
Chief Ministers of Meghalaya
Meghalaya MLAs 1993–1998
Chief ministers from Indian National Congress
State cabinet ministers of Meghalaya
Deputy chief ministers of Meghalaya
Scientists from Meghalaya
People from Imphal
Meghalaya MLAs 1998–2003
Meghalaya MLAs 2003–2008
Meghalaya MLAs 2008–2013
Meghalaya MLAs 2018–2023
Garo people
Trinamool Congress politicians
Trinamool Congress politicians from Meghalaya